Parliamentary elections were held in Greece on 9 June 1935. The result was a victory for the People's Party–National Radical Party alliance, which won 287 of the 300 seats in Parliament.

The elections were held in a climate of tension between the liberal Republicans, represented by the Venizelist parties, and the pro-royalist People's Party, following the failed Venizelist coup attempt in March. In protest at the execution of two prominent Venizelist generals, the continued function of special courts, and at the new electoral law, which they had not approved, all Venizelist parties decided not to participate. Without opponents, the right-wing parties had no problem in dominating the Parliament, whose role would be to adopt a new constitution and decide about the restoration of monarchy in the person of the exiled King George II.

Results

References

Parliamentary elections in Greece
Greece
Legislative election
1930s in Greek politics
History of Greece (1924–1941)
June 1935 events
Election and referendum articles with incomplete results
Legl